Macedonian Idol ( - Makedonski Idol) was a Macedonian reality-competition talent show airing on A1 TV, based on the popular British show Pop Idol. The auditions for the first season (after Idol Serbia-Montenegro & Macedonia) started in the summer 2010 and the show aired for first time on 13 November 2010. Hosts of the show are Ivanna Hadžievska and Nenad Gjeorgjievski.

Season 1

Auditions 

The auditions started in the summer 2010. Ten Macedonian cities were included: Ohrid, Kavadarci, Strumica, Veles, Štip, Kumanovo, Skopje, Bitola, Tetovo and Prilep.

Judges 
 Kaliopi Bukle - singer, pop diva
 Igor Džambazov - TV host, singer and actor
 Toni Mihajlovski  - TV host and actor

Live shows 

The concerts began airing on 7 March 2011 and in the semi-finals the finalists were divided on male and female. In the first and second semi-final ten candidates got in the final (5 male, 5 female), but in the third semi-final (Wildcard) three more candidates (2 male, 1 female) got in the finale. The big concerts or the finals started with the Top13 finalists. The shows are airing live every Monday in 20:00 (8:00 pm) CET. Every big concert has its theme.

References

Idols (franchise)
Television series by Fremantle (company)
2010 Macedonian television series debuts
Macedonian television series
Non-British television series based on British television series
A1 Televizija original programming